Jubilee is a football club based in Monrovia, Liberia. The team plays in Liberian Premier League.

Stadium
Their home Stadium is the Antoinette Tubman Stadium in Monrovia.

League participations
 Liberian Premier League: 2013–
 Liberian Second Division League: ????–2013

External links

Football clubs in Liberia
Sport in Monrovia